Kaliyuga Ramudu is a 1982 Indian Telugu-language action film, produced by D. Srirangaraju under the Tirupati Productions banner and directed by K. Bapaiah. It stars N. T. Rama Rao,  Rati Agnihotri  and music composed by K. V. Mahadevan.

Plot 
Ramu (NTR) is a CBI officer who comes to investigate a case. Sandhya (Rati Agnihotri) is a daughter of a scientist who invents a formula. Ranjeet (Satyanarayana) kidnaps the scientists and blackmails Sandhya, thereafter uses Sandhya for his own needs, sending her to gather information about Ramu. Ranjeet also marries Ramu's sister to protect himself from Ramu. During this process, Ramu and Sandhya fall in love and Ramu learn the truth about Sandhya.

Cast

N. T. Rama Rao as Ramu
Rati Agnihotri as Sandhya 
Satyanarayana as Ranjeeth
Jaggayya as G. D. Sastry 
Prabhakar Reddy as Billa
Allu Ramalingaiah as Allu Kumar 
Kanta Rao as Peter 
Mikkilineni as CBI Official 
Mukkamala as CBI Official
P. J. Sarma as CBI Official 
Anand Mohan as Ballu
Bheema Raju as Bhillu
Chalapathi Rao as CBI Official 
Sudhakar as Tony
Sarathi
Jagga Rao as Michael 
S. Varalakshmi as Jayamma & Suramma (dual role)
Kavitha as Savitri 
Jayamalini as item number
Malika as Rosy
Jaya Vijaya as Subbalakshmi 
Nirmalamma as Bamma
Vijaya Ranga Raju as Goon

Soundtrack

Music composed by K. V. Mahadevan. Lyrics were written by Acharya Aatreya. Music released by AVM Audio Company.

External links

1982 films
Films directed by K. Bapayya
Films scored by K. V. Mahadevan
1980s Telugu-language films